The Djibouti Super Cup (Super Coupe de Djibouti) is the football super cup competition in Djibouti, played between the winners of the Djibouti Premier League and the Djibouti Cup.

Results
[date?, 1989]	AS Port			4-2 CDE
[Oct 26, 2001]	CDE			1-0 FNP
[Oct 25, 2002]	AS Borreh		2-2 Total		    [4-3 pen]
[Nov 28, 2003]	Gendarmerie Nationale	2-1 AS Borreh
[Nov 10, 2005]	Poste Djibouti		4-0 CDE
[May 18, 2007]	SID			4-0 ASAS/Djibouti Télécom
[Nov  2, 2007]	SID			2-0 CDE/Colas
[Oct 17, 2009]  Garde Républicaine	1-1 ASAS/Djibouti Télécom   [4-2 pen]
[      , 2010]  Garde Républicaine      bt  ASAS/Djibouti Télécom 
[Oct 14, 2011]	ASAS/Djibouti Télécom	3-0 AS Port
[Nov 30, 2012]	Garde Républicaine   	2-1 AS Port
[Oct  4, 2013]	AS Port   	 	0-0 ASAS/Djibouti Télécom   [aet, 5-4 pen]
[Oct 24, 2014]  ASAS/Djibouti Télécom   3-0 AS Tadjourah
[Oct 14, 2016]  ASAS/Djibouti Télécom   6-2 FC Dikhil
[Oct  6, 2017]  Gendarmerie Nationale   7-0 ASAS/Djibouti Télécom

References

Football competitions in Djibouti
Djibouti